The 1932–33 Yorkshire Cup was the fifteenth occasion on which  Rugby Football League's (RFL) Yorkshire Cup competition had been held.

Leeds won the trophy by beating Wakefield Trinity by the score of 8-0

The match was played at Fartown, Huddersfield, now in West Yorkshire. The attendance was 17,685 and receipts were £1,183

This was Leeds' third of six victories in a period of ten years, during which time they won every Yorkshire Cup final in which they appeared

Background 

This season there were no junior/amateur clubs taking part, no new entrants and no "leavers" and so the total of entries remained the  same at fifteen.

This in turn resulted in one bye in the first round.

Competition and results

Round 1 
Involved  7 matches (with one bye) and 15 clubs

Round 2 – quarterfinals 
Involved 4 matches and 8 clubs

Round 2 - replays  
Involved  1 match and 2 clubs

Round 3 – semifinals  
Involved 2 matches and 4 clubs

Final

Teams and scorers 

Scoring - Try = three (3) points - Goal = two (2) points - Drop goal = two (2) points

The road to success

Notes and comments 
1 * Fartown was the home ground of Huddersfield from 1878 to the end of the 1991-92 season to Huddersfield Town FC's Leeds Road stadium, and then to the McAlpine Stadium in 1994. Fartown remained as a sports/Rugby League ground but is now rather dilapidated, and is only used for staging amateur rugby league games.

General information for those unfamiliar 
The Rugby League Yorkshire Cup competition was a knock-out competition between (mainly professional) rugby league clubs from  the  county of Yorkshire. The actual area was at times increased to encompass other teams from  outside the  county such as Newcastle, Mansfield, Coventry, and even London (in the form of Acton & Willesden.

The Rugby League season always (until the onset of "Summer Rugby" in 1996) ran from around August-time through to around May-time and this competition always took place early in the season, in the Autumn, with the final taking place in (or just before) December (The only exception to this was when disruption of the fixture list was caused during, and immediately after, the two World Wars)

See also 
1932–33 Northern Rugby Football League season
Rugby league county cups

References

External links
Saints Heritage Society
1896–97 Northern Rugby Football Union season at wigan.rlfans.com
Hull&Proud Fixtures & Results 1896/1897
Widnes Vikings - One team, one passion Season In Review - 1896-97
The Northern Union at warringtonwolves.org

RFL Yorkshire Cup
Yorkshire Cup